Applied Science University may refer to:

Applied Science Private University, a university in Jordan
Applied Science University (Bahrain), a university in Bahrain
Applied Science University (basketball team), a basketball team in Jordan